An election to Dublin City Council took place on 10 June 1999 as part of that year's Irish local elections. 52 councillors were elected from thirteen local electoral areas on the system of proportional representation by means of the single transferable vote (PR-STV) for a five-year term of office.

Results by party

Results by Electoral Area

Artane

Ballyfermot

Ballymun-Whitehall

Cabra-Glasnevin

Clontarf

Crumlin-Kimmage

Donaghmede

Finglas

North Inner City

Pembroke

Rathmines

South-East Inner City

South-West Inner City

External links
 https://www.housing.gov.ie/sites/default/files/migrated-files/en/Publications/LocalGovernment/Voting/FileDownLoad%2C1889%2Cen.pdf
 Official website
 http://irelandelection.com/council.php?elecid=173&tab=constit&detail=yes&electype=5&councilid=7&electype=5
 https://irishelectionliterature.com/others-project/old-local-election-results/

1999 Irish local elections
1999
1990s in Dublin (city)